The Botanical garden of Thutmose III is found in the temple of Amun-Re, and was constructed during the New Kingdom by Thutmose III. This structure is unique from other architecture found during this time. This complex was composed of three rooms including two antechambers that lead to the largest sanctuary of the complex. This large sanctuary is what is actually considered the Botanical Garden. The antechamber directly leading up to the Botanical garden can only be accessed through one calcite door that is high up off the ground and can only be reached and seen while using the staircase that leads up to it. However, this staircase was thought to commonly hold a tabernacle, so this door was not usually accessible. Between the outer two pillars there were sculptures of sphinxes that were positioned facing North towards the sanctuary, which was uncommon as well. There were many intricate carvings and designs on the walls that converge to the large door that leads to the Botanical Garden. Many of these depictions of scenes of the King and Gods doing different rituals, or celebrations. In the actual sanctuary, there were eight nooks carved into the wall, where divine statues were places. One of these was a granite statue of Thutmose III. On the walls of the sanctuary there were beautiful and detailed carvings of different plants and animals. Thutmose III expanded the boundaries of Egypt in the north and the south, collected a considerable collection of rare species of animals and lush plants. Those animals and botanical collections are found engraved on the walls of the sanctuary. Through the royal artists, the pharaoh boasts of the scenic beauty.

References

Bibliography
 Auguste Mariette, Karnak : étude topographique et archéologique, Musée de Boulaq, 1875, plates 28-31.
Nathalie Beaux, Le cabinet de curiosités de Thoutmosis III : plantes et animaux du « Jardin botanique » de Karnak, Leuven, Peeters, coll. « Orientalia Lovaniensia Analecta » (no 36), 1990
Laboury, D. (2007). Archaeological and Textual Evidence for the Function of the'Botanical Garden'of Karnak in the Initiation Ritual. In Sacred Spaces and Sacred Function in Ancient Thebes. Occasional Proceedings of the Theban Workshop (pp. 27-34). University of Chicago Press.
Robins, G.(2008). The art of Ancient Egypt. Cairo: The American University in Cairo Press.

Art of ancient Egypt
Karnak temple complex
Archaeological discoveries in Egypt
Thutmose III
Botanical art